Anthony De Sa may refer:

 Anthony De Sa (author), Canadian novelist and short story writer
 Anthony de Sa (civil servant), Indian retired civil servant